Kähäri is a district of the city of Turku, in Finland. It is located to the northwest of the city centre.

The current population of Kähäri is 934, which did not change during 2004. 17.77% of the district's population are under 15 years old, while 19.27% are over 65. The district's linguistic makeup is 93.47% Finnish, 4.93% Swedish, and 1.61% other.

See also
 Districts of Turku
 Districts of Turku by population

Districts of Turku